"Rivers" is a 2015 song by the Australian DJ and record producer Thomas Jack. Upon release, Jack said, "I’m really excited and honored to be releasing ‘Rivers’. It’s been a while since I released new music, and this track is very much in line with my musical direction right now." The track was released on 10 July 2015. It peaked at number 16 on VG-lista, the Norwegian Official Singles Chart.
The song features uncredited vocals from Tim Woodcock and Jack McManus.

Remixes were released on 29 October 2015.

A later version was released on 30 October 2015 by Thomas Jack featuring Norwegian R&B duo  Nico & Vinz.

Sound
Bianca Gracie of Idolator said, "It starts off with a charming acoustic guitar-flicked melody and soon rushes in with velvety vocals and shimmering synths that has "Summer" written all over it."

Music video
The official music video was released on 26 November 2015. It features Nico & Vinz, although they do not appear in the video. It features a young couple backpacking through a serene country all the while experiencing love, enchantment, freedom and bitterness in the end.

Track listings
Solo version
"Rivers" – 3:27

Remixes single
 "Rivers" (Sam Feldt & De Hofner Remix) – 4:11
 "Rivers" (Hugel Remix) – 4:15
 "Rivers" (Leon Lour Remix) – 4:39

Featuring Nico & Vinz
 "Rivers" – 3:27

Charts

References

Nico & Vinz songs
2015 songs
2015 singles
Songs written by Tim Woodcock
Songs written by Jürgen Dohr